The 1965 Preakness Stakes was the 90th running of the $200,000 Preakness Stakes thoroughbred horse race. The race took place on May 15, 1965, and was televised in the United States on the CBS television network. Tom Rolfe, who was jockeyed by Ron Turcotte, won the race by a scant neck over runner-up Dapper Dan. Approximate post time was 5:48 p.m. Eastern Time. The race was run on a fast track in a final time of 1:56-1/5.  The Maryland Jockey Club reported total attendance of 38,108, this is recorded as second highest on the list of American thoroughbred racing top attended events for North America in 1965.

Payout 

The 90th Preakness Stakes Payout Schedule

The full chart 

 Winning Breeder: Raymond R. Guest; (KY)
 Winning Time: 1:56 1/5
 Track Condition: Fast
 Total Attendance: 38,108

References

External links 
 
 Video of the 1965 Preakness Stakes 

1965
1965 in horse racing
1965 in American sports
1965 in sports in Maryland
Horse races in Maryland